Colin D'Cunha was Ontario Chief Medical Officer of Health during the SARS crisis. He was succeeded by Karim Kurji.
Dr. D'Cunha worked locally, provincially and at the national level in various capacities- Manitoba Chief Occupational Medical Officer, Medical Officer of Health for Scarborough and as a member of Federal Provincial Committees including the Advisory Committee on Occupational and Environmental Health, the Advisory Committee on Population Health, the Council of Chief Medical Officers of Health etc. He has presented on numerous occasions to the Parliament of Canada on a variety of subjects related to Health.

As Ontario Chief Medical Officer of Health, his annual reports covered a vast array of factors influencing public health- Antibiotic Resistance, Diabetes, Asthma, Blood Borne Infections, Injury Prevention etc. He developed Public Health system capacity and successfully saw the growth of the public health system by over 100%. The Ontario Universal Influenza Immunization Program was conceived, developed and delivered. This program was recognized globally as the first universal free flu shot program globally and earned him the nickname" Dr. Free Flu Shot". Dr. D'Cunha is very active in Canadian medicine-Royal College of Physicians and Surgeons of Canada-past member of the Specialty Committee of Community Medicine, past chair for 6 years of the Specialty Committee, past member of the Regional Advisory Committee, past member of the Fellowship Affairs Committee and the Nominating Committee; past Chief Examiner and Deputy Registrar of the Medical Council of Canada. 

D'Cunha is currently an adjunct professor at the Dalla Lana School of Public Health, University of Toronto, and is Director Global Medical Affairs at Apotex Inc..

References

Year of birth missing (living people)
Living people
Canadian public health doctors
People from Toronto